Nilufar Yakubbaeva (born 29 August 2000) is an Uzbekistani chess player. She was awarded the title of Woman International Master in 2020 and Woman Grandmaster in 2022

Career
She won the Women's section of the Uzbekistani Chess Championship three years in a row in 2019, 2020 and 2021.

Family
She has a younger brother, Nodirbek Yakubboev, who has won the Uzbekistani Chess Championship multiple times.

References

External links
 
 
 

2000 births
Living people
Uzbekistani chess players
Chess Woman International Masters
Chess Olympiad competitors